Central Finland (formerly Vaasa Province East) is a Finnish constituency represented in Eduskunta. It covers the administrative region of Central Finland, with a population of about 265,000. Central Finland currently elects ten members of Eduskunta.

The constituency is largely rural, and the only major city in the area is Jyväskylä. The largest party in the 2011 election was the Centre Party.

Members of Parliament 2019–2023 
 Bella Forsgrén (Green League)
 Teuvo Hakkarainen (Finns Party)
 Petri Honkonen (Centre Party)
 Anne Kalmari (Centre Party)
 Juho Kautto (Left Alliance)
 Jouni Kotiaho (Finns Party)
 Joonas Könttä (Centre Party)
 Riitta Mäkinen (Social Democratic Party)
 Piritta Rantanen (Social Democratic Party)
 Sinuhe Wallinheimo (National Coalition Party)

Members of Parliament 2015–2019 
 Lauri Ihalainen (Social Democratic Party)
 Anne Kalmari (Centre Party)
 Mauri Pekkarinen (Centre Party)
 Toimi Kankaanniemi (True Finns)
 Teuvo Hakkarainen (True Finns)
 Sinuhe Wallinheimo (National Coalition Party)
 Susanna Huovinen (Social Democratic Party)
 Touko Aalto (Green League)
 Aila Paloniemi (Centre Party)
 Petri Honkonen (Centre Party)

Members of Parliament 2011–2015 
 Anne Kalmari (Centre Party)
 Susanna Huovinen (Social Democratic Party)
 Henna Virkkunen (National Coalition Party)
 Mauri Pekkarinen (Centre Party)
 Kauko Tuupainen (True Finns)
 Sinuhe Wallinheimo (National Coalition Party)
 Aila Paloniemi (Centre Party)
 Eila Tiainen (Left Alliance)
 Tuula Peltonen (Social Democratic Party)
 Teuvo Hakkarainen (True Finns)

Members of Parliament 2007–2011
 Susanna Huovinen (SDP)
 Anne Kalmari (Kesk.)
 Matti Kangas (Left Alliance)
 Toimi Kankaanniemi (KD)
 Reijo Laitinen (SDP)
 Lauri Oinonen (Kesk.)
 Aila Paloniemi (Kesk.)
 Mauri Pekkarinen (Kesk.), Minister of Trade and Industry in Matti Vanhanen's second cabinet
 Tuula Peltonen (SDP)
 Henna Virkkunen (Kok.)

Election results

|}

|}

|}

See also
 Constituencies of Finland

References 

Parliament of Finland electoral districts
Central Finland